Die Burger (English: The Citizen) is a daily Afrikaans-language newspaper, published by Naspers. By 2008, it had a circulation of 91,665 in the Western and Eastern Cape Provinces of South Africa. Along with Beeld and Volksblad, it is one of three broadsheet dailies in the Media24 stable.

History 
On 18 December 1914, sixteen prominent Afrikaners gathered in Stellenbosch to discuss the establishment of a national newspaper.  With considerable financial support from local philanthropists Jannie and Christiaan Marais, purchased a quarter of 20,000 £1 shares in the new holding company, the project soon got off the ground, with the founding of De Nasionale Pers ("the National Press") and the selection of Dr. D. F. Malan as editor of its daily paper, De Burger (Dutch for "The Citizen"). The first issue was published on 26 July 1915.

Language 

Die Burger was originally published in Dutch. In 1916, the first Afrikaans-language articles were published. In 1921, the newspaper's Dutch title (De Burger) was translated into Afrikaans (Die Burger).

Supplements 
Sake24 (Mon-Fri) 
Buite (Tues)
Jip (Mon)
Leefstyl (Wed)
Motors (Thur)
Vrydag! (Fri)
Landbou (Fri)

Political affiliation 

Die Burger was a newspaper that supported the nationalist cause and apartheid, and used to be the mouthpiece of the National Party. This only began to change after 1985, when then editor Piet Cillié, a staunch supporter of the government under B. J. Vorster and P. W. Botha, retired. In 1990, the National Party was officially informed by editor Ebbe Dommisse that it no longer served as a political mouthpiece. This disaffiliation was continued in 1999 with the appointment of a more progressive editor, Arrie Rossouw. In 2006, Henry Jeffreys became the first Cape Coloured editor of the paper.

List of editors 
 D. F. Malan (1915-24)
 Albertus Geyer (1924-45)
 Phil Weber (1945-54)
 Piet Cillié (1954-77)
 Wiets Beukes (1977-90)
 Ebbe Dommisse (1990-2000)
 Arrie Rossouw (2000-06)
 Henry Jeffreys (2006-10)
 Bun Booyens (2010-2016)
 Willem Jordaan (2016-)

Distribution areas

Distribution figures

Readership figures

See also 
  List of newspapers in South Africa
 Hans Beukes
 Gideon Joubert

Sources
 Nieman Reports at Harvard University
 Die Burger 2000/8/05
 Die Burger 2005/7/26

References

External links 
 Die Burger Website 
 Newspapers in Port Elizabeth
 SAARF Website

Afrikaner culture in Cape Town
Daily newspapers published in South Africa
Afrikaans-language newspapers
Mass media in Cape Town
1914 establishments in South Africa
Publications established in 1914